Broom (historically sometimes spelled "Broome")  is a village in South Yorkshire,  England and is located in the former parish of Whiston about  southeast of Rotherham. Broom sits on top of a former Roman fortification and was the site of a Saxon trading town.  The village currently has a population of 900.  The town supports three pubs, a football club, Broom United, and numerous other small businesses.

References

Villages in South Yorkshire